Vadim Iosifovich Mulerman (18 August 1938 – 2 May 2018) was a Soviet, Ukrainian and American singer (baritone).

He was awarded the titles of Honored Artist of the RSFSR (1978) and Merited Artist of Ukraine.

In 1971, at the whim of Sergey Lapin, the then Chairman of the USSR State Committee for Radio and Television (Gosteleradio), Mulerman, along with several other singers of Jewish descent, was de facto barred from appearing on television.

Since 1989, Mulerman lived in the United States, where, in Florida, founded and managed a children's musical theater. As of 2008, he lived in Kharkiv and worked in a youth musical theater. Mulerman died on 2 May 2018 in New York City at the age of 79.

Selected songs 
 "King the Winner" (1968, based on the poem "Le retour du roi" by Maurice Carême)
 "Lada" (1968)
 • "Lada" (live on Russian television in 2013) on YouTube
 "No Coward Plays Hockey" (1968)
 • Listen on Yandex Music
 "How Nice to Be a General"
 "Hutsul Girl"
 "I Had a Dream" (1969)
 "August"

References

External links 

 
 Интервью изданию «Зеркало недели»

1938 births
2018 deaths
Soviet male singers
Soviet emigrants to the United States
Honored Artists of the RSFSR
People's Artists of the RSFSR
Musicians from Kharkiv
Russian bass-baritones
Recipients of the title of Merited Artist of Ukraine
Deaths from cancer in New York (state)
Soviet Jews
Russian Jews
20th-century American male singers
20th-century American singers